The Vuelta a la Argentina was a multi-day road cycling race held in Argentina. Only six editions were held: in 1952, 1990, 1991, 1992, 1999 and 2000.

Winners

References

Cycle races in Argentina
1952 establishments in Argentina
Recurring sporting events established in 1952
Recurring sporting events disestablished in 2000
Defunct cycling races in Argentina